is a 1979 Japanese crime thriller film based on a novel by Haruhiko Oyabu. It stars Yūsaku Matsuda as a criminal who disguises himself as a salaryman, and Jun Fubuki as his girlfriend. It was directed by Toru Murakawa.

Plot
Tetsuya Asakura, a mild-mannered accountant works for an oil company by day and as a bank-robbing assassin by night.  Hell-bent on bringing his corporation down, he finds he's not the only one as another criminal blackmails the top officials from the corporation. As loyalties are tested and double-crossed, Asakura soon finds himself in a deadly battle with the mafia.

Cast
Yūsaku Matsuda as Tetsuya Asakura
Jun Fubuki
Kei Satō
Koichi Iwaki
Kyosuke Machida
Asao Koike
Mikio Narita
Yutaka Nakajima 
Sonny Chiba
Kimie Shingyoji as Eriko Shimizu

References

External links

Kinema Jumpo database entry

1970s Japanese-language films
1979 films
Japanese crime thriller films
1970s action thriller films
1970s crime thriller films
Japanese action thriller films
1970s Japanese films